Aluminium oxide is an amphoteric oxide of aluminium with the chemical formula . It is also commonly referred to as alumina or aloxite in the mining, ceramic and materials science communities. It is produced by the Bayer process from bauxite. Its most significant use is in the production of aluminium metal, although it is also used as an abrasive due to its hardness and as a refractory material due to its high melting point.

Table
This is a list of countries by aluminium oxide in 2006 mostly based on British Geological Survey accessed in June 2008. This ranking then underwent some subsequent changes by 2018. 

* indicates "Natural resources of COUNTRY or TERRITORY" links.

References

External links
British Geological Survey complete list

Aluminium compounds
Aluminium oxide production